Levi was, according to the Book of Genesis, the founder of the Israelite Tribe of Levi.

Levi may also refer to:

People
 Levi (given name)
 Levi (surname)
 Levi (Book of Mormon), Jaredite king in the Book of Mormon
 Levi (New Testament), great-great grandfather of Jesus
 Levi II (fl. 3rd century), one of the amoraim
 Saint Matthew, referred to as Levi in the other Gospels
 Laevi, or Levi, a Ligurian people in Gallia Transpadana

Places
 Levi, Estonia, a village in southwestern Estonia
 Levi, Finland, a ski resort in Finnish Lapland
 Levi, Kentucky, an unincorporated community in the United States
 Levi-Civita (crater)
 Rabbi Levi (crater)

See also
 Levi Strauss (disambiguation)
 
 Leevi, a village in southeastern Estonia
 Levite
 Levis (disambiguation)
 Levy (disambiguation)
 Levey
 Levin (disambiguation)
 Levit
 Levitt
 Levitzki